The Mil Mi-2 (NATO reporting name Hoplite) is a small, three rotor blade Soviet-designed multi-purpose helicopter developed by the Mil Moscow Helicopter Plant designed in the early 1960s, and produced exclusively by WSK "PZL-Świdnik" in Poland.

Design and development

The Mi-2 was produced exclusively in Poland, in the WSK "PZL-Świdnik" factory in Świdnik.

The first production helicopter in the Soviet Union was the Mil Mi-1, modelled along the lines of the S-51 and Bristol Sycamore and flown by Mikhail Mil's bureau in September 1948. During the 1950s it became evident, and confirmed by American and French development, that helicopters could be greatly improved with turbine engines. S. P. Isotov developed the GTD-350 engine and Mil used two of these in the far superior Mi-2.

The twin shaft-turbine engines used in the Mi-2 develop 40% more power than the Mi-1's piston engines, for barely half the engine weight, with the result that the payload was more than doubled. The Mi-2 fuselage was extensively altered from its predecessor, with the engines mounted overhead. However, the external dimensions remained similar.

The Mil-built prototype first flew in the Soviet Union on 22 September 1961, after the initial development the project was transferred to Poland in 1964. The first Świdnik-built example flew on 4 November 1965 (making this the only Soviet-designed helicopter to be built solely outside the Soviet Union). PZL-Świdnik produced a total of 5,497 helicopters, about a third for military users. The factory also developed fiberglass rotor blades, and developed the wide-body Mi-2M seating 10 passengers instead of eight. Most typical role-change kits include four stretchers for air ambulance usage, or aerospraying or cropdusting applications.

In Poland, several specialized military variants were also developed in early 1970s for support or training roles, with 23 mm autocannon, machine guns and/or two 57 mm rocket pods, four 9K11 Malyutka anti-tank missiles or Strela-2 AA missiles.

Operational history

The Mi-2 was first introduced into the Soviet Air Force in 1965. The Mi-2 is used by mainly former Soviet and Eastern Bloc countries, although it was also purchased by Mexico and Myanmar armed forces.

Most of the armed Mi-2 variants were used by Poland. Some were also used by the former East Germany (with 7.62 mm machine gun and 57 mm unguided rocket armament only).

North Korea still maintains a large active fleet of Mi-2s.

During the 2022 Russian invasion of Ukraine, Russian forces were recorded capturing three Mi-2 helicopters in Kherson International Airport.

The helicopter is also used to spray agricultural chemicals by private owners in Ukraine. 2 were killed in a crash in 2021 near Zaive in the region of Mykolaiv.

Variants

V-2
First prototype.
V-2V
Armament prototype.
Mi-2 Platan
Aerial minelayer version with 20 tube launchers on external pods and in left cab door, each for six or nine mines. 18 converted for Polish Army starting from 1989.
Mi-2A
Mi-2B
Upgraded export version for the Middle East, fitted with improved systems and navigational aids.
Mi-2Ch Chekla
Chemical reconnaissance / smokescreen layer version.
Mi-2D Przełącznik
Aerial command post equipped with R-111 radio.
Mi-2FM
Survey version.
Mi-2P
Passenger / cargo version, with accommodation for 6 passengers.
Mi-2R
Agricultural version.
Mi-2RL
Land rescue/ambulance version.
Mi-2RM
Sea rescue version equipped with electric winch for two people and dropped rafts.
Mi-2Ro
Reconnaissance version equipped with cameras.
UMi-2Ro
Reconnaissance trainer version.
Mi-2RS Padalec ('Slowworm')
Chemical and biohazard reconnaissance version.
Mi-2S
Air ambulance version, equipped to carry four stretcher, plus an attendant.
Mi-2Sz
Dual-control training version.
Mi-2T
Cargo/utility version.
Mi-2U
Dual-control training version.
Mi-2US
Armed version fitted with a fixed 23mm NS-23 cannon, 4 x 7,62mm PKT machine gun pods and optional cabin PK machine gun. 30 built for Polish Army in 1972-73. Similar without a cannon built for East Germany.
Mi-2URN Żmija ('Viper')
Armed variant with a fixed 23mm NS-23 gun and two 16x57mm S-5 unguided rocket pods Mars-2. Optional 7,62mm PK machine gun window-mounted. 7 built for Polish Army in 1973 and 18 rebuilt from Mi-2US. Similar without a cannon built for East Germany.
Mi-2URP Salamandra ('Salamander')
Anti-tank variant, armed with 23mm NS-23 gun, optional window-mounted 7,62mm PK machine gun, and 4x AT-3 Sagger (9M14M Malutka) wire-guided missiles on external weapons racks and 4x additional missiles in the cargo compartment. Two rebuilt and 44 built for Polish Army in 1975-84.
Mi-2URP-G Gniewosz ('Smooth snake')
Mi-2URP with additional 4x AA missiles Strzała-2 (Strela 2) in two Gad rocket launchers. Six rebuilt in 1988.
Mi-2 Plus
Upgraded Mi-2 with uprated GTD-350W2 engines, all-composite rotor blades, new avionics and other modifications.
Mi-3
Planned Mi-2 derivative that lacked suitable engines for the program to continue.
Mi-2MSB or MSB-2 Nadia ('Hope')
Modernized by Motor Sich to passenger-transport version for the civil aviation.
Mi-2MSB-V or MSB-2MO
Modernized by Motor Sich for Ukrainian Air Force. Original engine replaced with AI-450M  engine, armed with rocket and machine gun pods, IR-jamming system and flares dispenser for defence against MANPADS.

Operators

Algerian Air Force 

Armenian Air Force 

Azerbaijani Air Force

Belarusian Air Force

Air Force of the Democratic Republic of the Congo

Indonesian Navy
Indonesian Police

Libyan Air Force

Myanmar Air Force

North Korean Air Force

Peruvian Army

Polish Air Force
Polish Army
Polish Border Guard
Polish Navy

Russian Air Force

Senegal Air Force

Syrian Air Force

Armed Forces of Transnistria

 Ukrainian Army

United States Army 
University of Iowa

Former operators

Bulgarian Air Force 

Cuban Air Force
 Czechoslovakia
Czech Air Force

Djiboutian Air Force

Estonian Air Force

East German Air Force (48 Mi-2 in 1972-1990, including Grenztruppen)
Grenztruppen

German Air Force (25 in 1991-1995)
German State Police

Ghana Air Force

Hungarian Air Force
Hungarian PoliceLatvian Air Force

Lithuanian Air Force
 Justice Air Wing

Mexican Navy

Mongolian Air Force 

Nicaraguan Air Force

 Air ambulances in Poland

Russian Army

Slovak Air Force

Ukrainian Air Force

Aeroflot
Soviet Air Force
Soviet Army Aviation

Yugoslav People's Army

Specifications (Mi-2T)

See also

References

Hoyle, Craig and Fafard, Antoine. "World Air Forces Directory". Flight International, 10–16 December 2019, Volume 196, issue 5716. pp. 26–54.
Mondey, David,  Encyclopedia of The World's Commercial and Private Aircraft. Crescent Books, New York NY, 1981. p. 245, "WSK-Swidnik Mi-2 Hoplite"
Taylor, John W. R. Jane's All The World's Aircraft 1982–83. London: Jane's Yearbooks, 1982. .
Mi-2 DataBase
Mi-2 Photo Gallery

External links

Mi-02
Mil aircraft
1960s Soviet civil utility aircraft
1960s Soviet military utility aircraft
Poland–Soviet Union relations
1960s Soviet helicopters
PZL aircraft
1960s Polish helicopters
Twin-turbine helicopters
Aircraft first flown in 1961